= Phalcon/Skism =

Computer virus writing group

Phalcon/Skism was a group that wrote computer viruses in the 1990s. It was formed by the merger of two New York City-based virus writing groups: Skism (for "Smart Kids Into Sick Methods"), formed by the virus writer called "Hellraiser", and Phalcon. They wrote and distributed the online magazine 40Hex (1991–1998), as well as the virus creation tool Phalcon-Skism Mass Produced Code Generator (1992). In 1992, the group claimed to have around 12 members, aged 15 to 23 years.
